Bulnesia arborea is a species of flowering plant in the creosote subfamily (Larreoideae) of family Zygophyllaceae. It is native to Colombia and Venezuela. Related to the true lignum vitae trees (Guaiacum), it is known as Maracaibo lignum vitae or (like its relative B. sarmientoi) as "verawood".

References

arborea
Flora of Colombia
Flora of Venezuela